Antti Kemppi (9 July 1893, Antrea - 2 October 1974) was a Finnish farmer, lay preacher and politician. He was a member of the Parliament of Finland from 1927 to 1945, representing the Agrarian League.

References

1893 births
1974 deaths
People from Kamennogorsk
People from Viipuri Province (Grand Duchy of Finland)
Finnish Lutherans
Centre Party (Finland) politicians
Members of the Parliament of Finland (1927–29)
Members of the Parliament of Finland (1929–30)
Members of the Parliament of Finland (1930–33)
Members of the Parliament of Finland (1933–36)
Members of the Parliament of Finland (1936–39)
Members of the Parliament of Finland (1939–45)
Finnish people of World War II
20th-century Lutherans